The Uarini River is a river of Amazonas state in north-western Brazil.
It is a tributary of the Solimões River.

The Uarini River flows north through the  Baixo Juruá Extractive Reserve, created in 2001.
It then flows in a roughly northeast direction, entering the Solimões near the town of Uarini.

See also
List of rivers of Amazonas

References

Rivers of Amazonas (Brazilian state)
Tributaries of the Amazon River